William Alves Boys, KC (July 9, 1868 – February 20, 1938) was a Canadian politician and barrister.

Born in Barrie, Ontario, he was mayor of Barrie between 1902 and 1904 and commissioner of Simcoe County, Ontario between 1905 and 1906. He was elected to the House of Commons of Canada in a 1912 by-election as a Member of the Conservative Party to represent the riding of Simcoe South. He was re-elected in 1917 and 1921 then re-elected in the riding of Simcoe North in 1925 and 1926. He was the Whip of the Conservative Party (1921–1926) then Chief Government Whip in 1926. During the 16th Parliament, he was a member of the Special Joint Committee appointed on claims of the allied Indian tribes of British Columbia.

Election results

Simcoe South

Simcoe North

External links
 

1868 births
1938 deaths
Conservative Party of Canada (1867–1942) MPs
Mayors of Barrie
Members of the House of Commons of Canada from Ontario
Unionist Party (Canada) MPs
Place of death missing
Canadian King's Counsel
Lawyers in Ontario